Dominique Bilde (born 1 August 1953) is a National Rally Member of the European Parliament representing East France.

References

1953 births
Living people
MEPs for East France 2014–2019
MEPs for France 2019–2024
National Rally (France) MEPs
Politicians from Nancy, France
Regional councillors of Grand Est